In Gaita zuliana music, from Venezuela, the tambora is a one-headed drum played with sticks. The player can sit on it or put it between his or her legs to perform rhythms on the instrument by hitting the head, the rim, or the body of the drum.

References
 Beck, John (1994). Encyclopedia of Percussion. Garland.

External links
Youtube video - Tambora of gaita
Venezuelan tambora

Drums
South American percussion instruments
Venezuelan musical instruments